Charaña is a high elevation town in the altiplano of the La Paz Department in Bolivia. It is the seat of the Charaña Municipality, the fifth municipal section of the Pacajes Province.

History
Charaña was the scene of the famous meeting between President Augusto Pinochet of Chile and Hugo Banzer on 8 February 1975 when they signed a Joint Declaration (Charaña Act), which restored diplomatic relations between the two countries which were broken since April 1962.

Climate

References 

Populated places in La Paz Department (Bolivia)